"Love and War" (stylized as "Love + War") is the debut single by Banks & Steelz, a collaborative project created by Interpol frontman Paul Banks and Wu-Tang Clan member RZA. Featuring a rap verse from fellow Wu-Tang Clan member Ghostface Killah, it was premiered on the Apple Music radio station Beats 1 on May 19, 2016. It was subsequently released as a digital download, acting as the lead single from their debut studio album, Anything But Words (2016). A music video for the song, which pays tribute to the film Reservoir Dogs, was also released on May 20.

Composition
"Love and War" is a rock-influenced hip hop song. It features rap verses from RZA and Ghostface Killah as well as a sung chorus done by Paul Banks, where he repeats "All is fair in love and war / What you keeping score for" throughout. April Clare Welsh of Fact stated that the song is built around "shuffling grooves, driving guitar and Mariachi-style trumpet."

Music video
The music video for the "Love and War" was released on the duo's YouTube channel on May 20, 2016. Directed by director group Arms Race, the video is a tribute to an iconic torture scene from the 1992 Quentin Tarantino-directed film Reservoir Dogs. The video has been described as "grisly" by Sarah Murphy of Exclaim!. Tom Breihan of Stereogum described the video, saying that it "starts out as a yakuza torture scene, and it takes some unexpected turns." Banks and RZA also appear in the video as hired guns; RZA shares "Tarantino-esque" dialogue with Banks, who remains mute during the video. RZA had worked with Tarantino in the past; he worked on the soundtrack for his Kill Bill series.

Track listing

Personnel
Personnel adapted from AllMusic.

Banks & Steelz
Paul Banks – composing, production, vocals
RZA – composing, production, vocals

Additional personnel
Beatriz Artola – engineer
Matthew Barrick – drums
Brandon Bost – assistant engineer
Vira Byramji – engineer
Greg Calbi – mastering
Mike Crossey – mixing, programming
Steve Fallone – mastering
Ghostface Killah – composing, vocals

Jonathan Gilmore – engineer, mixing engineer
Billy Hickey – engineer
John Horne – assistant engineer
Phil Joly – engineer
Rob Moose – piano
Clinton Patterson – trumpet
Brandon H. Smith – assistant engineer
Gosha Usov – assistant engineer
Steve Vealey – engineer
Joe Visciano – engineer

Release history

References

2016 singles
2016 songs